Tomotaka Okamoto may refer to:

Tomotaka Okamoto (footballer), Japanese footballer
Tomotaka Okamoto (singer), Japanese sopranist